Madadeni is a town in Newcastle, KwaZulu-Natal, South Africa, which falls under Amajuba District Municipality. As of the 2011 census Madadeni has population of 119,497 citizens.

Medical
From the two government hospitals in Newcastle, Madadeni houses one which is the Madadeni Provincial Hospital.

Education

Basic education
Madadeni has a total of 30 basic education schools, consisting of 20 primary schools and 10 secondary/high schools. Private Schooling is also offered by the Meridian Newcastle, managed by Curro Holding Ltd.

Higher education and training
Madadeni houses two of the 8 Majuba College campuses, namely the "Centre For People Development" and the "Majuba Technology Centre," with the institutions' focus being on Business Studies and Engineering Studies respectively.

Unrest
During 2021's unrest the Hofina Poultry Shop was vandalised and approximately 25,000 eggs, 10,000 chickens, 700 goats and 500 sheep were stolen. The shop was shut down and later reopened 14 km away with a smaller staff compliment. In the wake of the unrest many locals have complained about losing their employment, having to travel further to work, and paying more for some food items.

References

Populated places in the Newcastle Local Municipality
Townships in KwaZulu-Natal